Lachlan Sholl (born 7 March 2000) is an Australian rules footballer who plays for the Adelaide Crows in the Australian Football League (AFL). He was recruited by the Adelaide Crows with the 64th draft pick in the 2018 AFL draft. Sholl is the son of former Carlton player Brett Sholl, and nephew of former North Melbourne player Craig Sholl and former Geelong player Brad Sholl.

Early football
Sholl played junior football for the St Bernard's Football Club. He also played for the Calder Cannons in the NAB League. During his two seasons with the Cannons, Sholl played 28 games and kicked 9 goals. Sholl represented Vic Metro in the AFL Under 18 Championships in 2018, playing 3 games and recording a disposal average of 16.7 and disposal efficiency of 70%.

AFL career

2020 season
Sholl debuted in the Crows' fifty one point loss to the Melbourne Football Club in the 10th round of the 2020 AFL season. On debut, Sholl collected 10 disposals, 1 mark, 1 tackle and 2 clearances. After two impressive performances in Rounds 17 and 18 of the 2020 AFL season, where he collected a combined total of 2 goals, 43 disposals, 9 marks and 4 clearances, he earned a rising star nomination in the final round of the season, after narrowly missing out the week before to 's Isaac Quaynor. Sholl earned praise from past footballers such as David King, who stated "I think this kid could be the best kick in the comp in the next 18 months, you watch him and he’s deadly by foot. Over the last six or seven games that we’ve seen him play – and it’s only very early – but his skills stand out already for the Adelaide Crows. I don’t see too many youngsters come in and inject themselves into the game like he has."

2021 season
Sholl became just the 12th player in AFL history to receive 2 Rising Star nominations, after he received a 2021 AFL Rising Star nomination for his inspired performance against , where he collected 31 disposals and a goal.

Statistics
 Statistics are correct to Round 22 2021

|-
|scope="row" style="text-align:center" | 2019
|  || 38 || 0 || — || — || — || — || — || — || — || — || — || — || — || — || — || —
|- style="background-color: #EAEAEA"
! scope="row" style="text-align:center" | 2020
|style="text-align:center;"|
| 38 || 8 || 2 || 1 || 72 || 33 || 105 || 24 || 7 || 0.3 || 0.1 || 9.0 || 4.1 || 13.1 || 3.0 || 0.9
|- 
| scope="row" text-align:center | 2021
| 
| 38 || 19 || 3 || 7 || 208 || 126 || 334 || 78 || 21 || 0.2 || 0.4 || 10.9 || 6.6 || 17.6 || 4.1 || 1.1
|- style="background:#EAEAEA; font-weight:bold; width:2em"
| scope="row" text-align:center class="sortbottom" colspan=3 | Career
| 27
| 5
| 8
| 280
| 159
| 439
| 102
| 28
| 0.1
| 0.2
| 10.3
| 5.8
| 16.2
| 3.7
| 1.0
|}

References

External links
 
 
 

2000 births
Living people
Adelaide Football Club players
Australian rules footballers from Victoria (Australia)
Calder Cannons players